Mispila punctifrons is a species of beetle in the family Cerambycidae. It was described by Stephan von Breuning in 1938. It is known from Myanmar and Bangladesh.

References

punctifrons
Beetles described in 1938